Luis Álvarez de Cervera (born 23 July 1947 in Madrid) is a Spanish equestrian who competed at six Olympic Games between 1972 and 1996. He was the first Spaniard to do so; as of 2010, the only other Spaniard to compete at six Olympics is water polo player Manuel Estiarte.

He was part of the Spanish team that came fourth in the Mixed Jumping at the 1992 Barcelona Olympics, missing out on bronze by 0.75 points.

Luis Álvarez de Cervera collaborated, together with the also prominent Olympic riders Joaquín Larraín Coddou and Luis Lucio, in the Spanish translation made by the Panamanian rider Anastasios Moschos of the official instruction handbook of the German National Equestrian Federation, Tecnicas Avanzadas de Equitación - Manual Oficial de Instrucción de la Federación Ecuestre Alemana. This Spanish edition was foreworded by the former president of the International Federation for Equestrian Sports (FEI), the Infanta Doña Pilar, Duchess of Badajoz and was published in Spain and Latin America.

Personal
His son, Eduardo Álvarez Aznar, is also an equestrian. He competed in the 2016 Olympic Games.

See also
List of athletes with the most appearances at Olympic Games

References

External links
Sports-Reference Profile

1947 births
Living people
Sportspeople from Madrid
Equestrians at the 1972 Summer Olympics
Equestrians at the 1976 Summer Olympics
Equestrians at the 1984 Summer Olympics
Equestrians at the 1988 Summer Olympics
Equestrians at the 1992 Summer Olympics
Equestrians at the 1996 Summer Olympics
Olympic equestrians of Spain
Spanish male equestrians
Spanish show jumping riders
Competitors at the 1979 Mediterranean Games
Competitors at the 1983 Mediterranean Games
Mediterranean Games competitors for Spain
Mediterranean Games medalists in equestrian
Mediterranean Games gold medalists for Spain
Mediterranean Games bronze medalists for Spain
20th-century Spanish people